The CAMS 38 was a French single-seat racing flying-boat designed by Raffaele Conflenti and built by Chantiers Aéro-Maritimes de la Seine (CAMS) for the 1923 Schneider Trophy race. The CAMS 38 was withdrawn from the race during the second lap.

Design and development
The CAMS 38 was a single-seat equal-span biplane with a  Hispano-Suiza 8Fd Spécial inline piston engine faired into the underside of the upper wing. The engine drove a two-bladed pusher propeller. The single-seat cockpit was located forward of the wing leading edge towards the front of the hull.

The CAMS 38 was flown in the 1923 Schneider Trophy race by the company's chief test pilot Maurice Hurel. It was damaged by a wave before takeoff but completed the first lap. During the second lap Hurel was forced to land with a vibrating engine and loss of power. During the following year the aircraft was used for flight trials but was soon scrapped.

Specifications

See also

References

Notes

Bibliography

Single-engined pusher aircraft
Biplanes
Flying boats
Schneider Trophy
1920s French sport aircraft
38